Wanzia is a monotypic genus of Central African araneomorph spiders in the family Cyatholipidae containing the single species, Wanzia fako. It was first described by C. E. Griswold in 1998, and has only been found in Cameroon and in Equatorial Guinea.

References

Cyatholipidae
Monotypic Araneomorphae genera
Spiders of Africa